Jablon may refer to:

 Jabloň, Slovakia
 Jabłoń, Lublin Voivodeship, east Poland
 Jabłoń, Warmian-Masurian Voivodeship, north Poland
 Jabłoń Kościelna
 Jabłoń-Dąbrowa
 Jabłoń-Dobki
 Jabłoń-Jankowce
 Jabłoń-Kikolskie
 Jabłoń-Markowięta
 Jabłoń-Piotrowce
 Jabłoń-Rykacze
 Jabłoń-Samsony
 Jabłoń-Spały
 Jabłoń-Śliwowo
 Jabłoń-Uszyńskie
 Jabłoń-Zambrowizna
 Jabłoń-Zarzeckie
 Konopki-Jabłoń
 Nagórki-Jabłoń
 Poryte-Jabłoń

See also